is a railway station located in the town of Fukaura, Aomori Prefecture, Japan, operated by the East Japan Railway Company (JR East).

Lines

Station layout
Kasose  Station has one ground-level side platform serving a single bi-directional track. The station is unattended and is managed from Goshogawara Station. There is no station building.

History
Kosose Station was opened on November 20, 1954 as a station on the Japan National Railways (JNR). It has been unattended since March 19, 1984. With the privatization of the JNR on April 1, 1987, it came under the operational control of JR East.

Surrounding area

See also
 List of Railway Stations in Japan

References

External links

  

Stations of East Japan Railway Company
Railway stations in Aomori Prefecture
Gonō Line
Fukaura, Aomori
Railway stations in Japan opened in 1954